Public Prosecutor is an American television series produced in 1947–1948, which first aired in 1951.

Broadcast history
Public Prosecutor was the first dramatic series to be shot on film (in this case, 16 mm film to save production costs), instead of being performed and broadcast live. 

John Howard starred in the title role of public prosecutor Stephen Allen, along with Anne Gwynne as his secretary Patricia Kelly and Walter Sande as his assistant Evans. Each story began with the cast members addressing the camera (representing the TV viewers) directly, welcoming them to the office and bringing them up to date on the current case. The supporting casts were familiar from theatrical B movies and serials of the day.

The format was patterned after daytime radio dramas, which ran in 15-minute installments. Jerry Fairbanks Productions filmed the pilot episode in Hollywood in 1947. After the NBC Television Network picked up the series, Fairbanks filmed 26 episodes for a planned network premiere in September 1948. The completed films ran about 17-1/2 minutes each, like MGM's theatrical Crime Does Not Pay short subjects. Producer Fairbanks, who had made shorts for theaters since the late 1930s, may have foreseen Public Prosecutor having a second life as a theatrical series; the two-reel length was ideal for movie theaters, but too long for a 15-minute TV show and too short for a half-hour show.

Public Prosecutor was pulled from the network schedule when NBC decided it preferred 30-minute episodes.

Production of the still-unseen series was suspended in October 1948 due to high costs and the lack of a national sponsor. Instead, the NBC anthology series Your Show Time became American television's first filmed dramatic series to be broadcast, in January 1949. The earliest syndicated airings of Public Prosecutor were in February 1951.

The DuMont Television Network broadcast the series as Crawford Mystery Theatre (named after sponsor Crawford Clothes) September 6–27, 1951, and continuing locally until February 28, 1952. The producers turned it into a panel show to fill out the program to 30 minutes. Each week, three guest panelists watched an episode, which was halted just before the climax. Each panelist then tried to guess the identity of the guilty party. Veteran radio announcer and future game-show host Warren Hull presided over the half-hour version of Public Prosecutor. 

When Public Prosecutor was syndicated in the 1950s, the episodes had been re-edited to fit a 15-minute time slot. Film historian Thomas Schatz writes,
Narrated by Howard, who addresses the camera throughout much of the story, the bare-bones mystery plots are condensed to fit into fifteen-minute segments modeled after the format of radio episodes. The verbal exposition is so insistent that the images begin to seem redundant; the episodes truly resemble radio with pictures. Sets are undecorated. Actors appear distracted, if not anguished, as they try to hit their marks consistently in the first take. In spite of the opportunities for shot selection offered by the Multicam system, the camera work consists mainly of single-take medium shots or simple over-the-shoulder dialogue sequences.

Episode status
One episode of Public Prosecutor is in the collection of the Museum of Broadcast Communications. Currently there are at least 10 episodes posted on YouTube. Alpha Video has released eight episodes of the series in a two-volume DVD set.

Episodes

See also
List of programs broadcast by the DuMont Television Network
List of surviving DuMont Television Network broadcasts
1947-48 United States network television schedule
1951-52 United States network television schedule

References

Bibliography
David Weinstein, The Forgotten Network: DuMont and the Birth of American Television (Philadelphia: Temple University Press, 2004) 
Alex McNeil, Total Television, Fourth edition (New York: Penguin Books, 1980) 
Tim Brooks and Earle Marsh, The Complete Directory to Prime Time Network TV Shows, Third edition (New York: Ballantine Books, 1985)

External links
Public Prosecutor at IMDB
Crawford Mystery Theatre at IMDB
List of episodes at CTVA
DuMont historical website
"The Case of the Comic-Strip Murder" (aired September 20, 1951) at Internet Archive
"The Case of the Man Who Wasn't There" (aired January 17, 1952) at Internet Archive
Public Prosecutor episodes on YouTube

DuMont Television Network original programming
1951 American television series debuts
1952 American television series endings
1950s American mystery television series
1950s American crime drama television series
Black-and-white American television shows
Television series about prosecutors